GI=Go is the second album of the trio The Bootstrappers.

Track list
 Optimize My Hard Disk, Baby
 Command Z
 RTFM
 System Crash
 Garbage In, Garbage Out
 Zero Divide
 Heapfix
 Meat Companion
 8-Bit Living

Personnel
 Elliott Sharp: Guitar
 Thom Kotik: Bass
 Jan Jakub Kotík: Drums

External links
 

Bootstrappers (band) albums
1992 albums